Robert Eyre (by 1518 – 1570 or later) was an English politician.

Eyre was mayor of Salisbury in 1558–59. He was a Member (MP) of the Parliament of England for Salisbury in 1558 and Weymouth in 1563.

References

Year of death missing
Year of birth uncertain
English MPs 1558
English MPs 1563–1567
Mayors of Salisbury